Pygmaepterys avatea is a species of sea snail, a marine gastropod mollusc in the family Muricidae, the murex snails or rock snails.

Description

Distribution
This marine species occurs off the Austral Islands, French Polynesia.

References

External links
 Houart R. & Tröndlé J. (2008). Update of Muricidae (excluding Coralliophilinae) from French Polynesia with description of ten new species. Novapex. 9(2-3): 53-93.

Muricidae
Gastropods described in 2008